Brickellia pendula is a Mexican species of flowering plants in the family Asteraceae. It is native to central and northeastern Mexico, (Tamaulipas, Veracruz, Hidalgo, D.F., México, Morelos, Oaxaca, Michoacán).

References

External links
Field Museum Neotropical Herbarium Specimens photo of herbarium specimen of Brickellia pendula collected in Michoacán

pendula
Flora of Mexico
Plants described in 1830